Homilopscocidea is an infraorder of Psocodea (formerly Psocoptera). It is probably a paraphyletic group, still in use for lack of a better solution. There are about 7 families and more than 1,200 described species in Homilopsocidea.

Families
These seven families belong to the infraorder Homilopsocidea:
 Ectopsocidae Roesler, 1944 (outer barklice)
 Elipsocidae Pearman, 1936 (damp barklice)
 Lachesillidae Pearman, 1936 (fateful barklice)
 Lesneiidae Schmidt & New, 2004
 Mesopsocidae Pearman, 1936 (middle barklice)
 Peripsocidae Roesler, 1944 (stout barklice)
 Sabulopsocidae Schmidt & New, 2004

Sources

Lienhard, C. & Smithers, C. N. 2002. Psocoptera (Insecta): World Catalogue and Bibliography. Instrumenta Biodiversitatis, vol. 5. Muséum d'histoire naturelle, Genève.

Further reading

 
 
 

Insect infraorders
Psocomorpha